The North-East Metropolitan Province was a two-member electoral province of the Western Australian Legislative Council, located in metropolitan Perth. It was one of several metropolitan seats created following the enactment of the Constitution Acts Amendment Act (No.2) 1963, and became effective on 22 May 1965. The province was very safe for the Labor Party, which held most or all of the component Assembly seats.

In 1989, the province was abolished by the Acts Amendment (Electoral Reform) Act 1987, and was split between the five-member East Metropolitan and seven-member North Metropolitan regions under the new proportional voting system.

Geography
The province was made up of several complete Legislative Assembly districts, which changed at each distribution.

Representation

Members

References
 

Former electoral provinces of Western Australia